The Charles H. Mouton House(French: Maison de Charles Mouton), also known as Shady Oaks, is a historic house located at 338 North Sterling Street in Lafayette, Louisiana.

Built in 1848 as the residence of Charles Homere Mouton, the house is a two-and-one-half story Greek Revival building with a front gallery with Doric posts, a brick ground floor, a frame second floor and pitched roof.

The house was listed on the National Register of Historic Places on June 9, 1980. It was also added as a contributing property to the Sterling Grove Historic District at the time of its creation, on July 26, 1984.

See also
 National Register of Historic Places listings in Lafayette Parish, Louisiana
 Sterling Grove Historic District

References

Houses on the National Register of Historic Places in Louisiana
Greek Revival architecture in Louisiana
Houses completed in 1848
Lafayette Parish, Louisiana
National Register of Historic Places in Lafayette Parish, Louisiana